Stanley Stubbs (19 February 1906 – 25 October 1976) was an English educationalist. He was headmaster of Soham Grammar School from 1940 to 1945, and of The Perse School, Cambridge from 1945 until 1969. He is buried at the Parish of the Ascension Burial Ground in Cambridge, with his wife Margaret Eleanor Stubbs.

References

 ‘STUBBS, Stanley’, Who Was Who, A & C Black, an imprint of Bloomsbury Publishing plc, 1920–2008; online edn, Oxford University Press, Dec 2007 accessed 14 March 2013
 Obituaries: Mr Stanley Stubbs The Times, Wednesday, Oct 27, 1976; pg. 18; Issue 59845; col F

External links
 

1906 births
1976 deaths
Headmasters of the Perse School